The Idiot Weekly (1958–1962) was a radio program made by the Australian Broadcasting Commission.

Background
Transcriptions of The Goon Show were broadcast on Australian radio from late 1955. When Spike Milligan visited his parents in Woy Woy in 1958, the Australian Broadcasting Commission signed him for a series of radio comedy broadcasts. They hoped for a local equivalent of The Goon Show with an Australian slant to it, but without Peter Sellers and Harry Secombe.

Format and characters
The format was very similar to The Goon Show, with Milligan recycling or adapting scripts and jokes for the new show. The show contained typical Goonish humour and some of Milligan's Goon Show characters, notably Eccles, made regular appearances. However it was distinctly Australian with plots translated to Australian locations and frequent references to topical events and Australian political figures of the time.

The closing credits were "a radio reading of The Idiot Weekly" with the actors credited as "Headlines by.." or "Cartoons by..." and the producer credited as a sub-editor.

Running gags
Many episodes include references to the perceived poor state of the ABC, usually by the announcer. For example, "This is the Australian Broadcasting Commission and it's going bald" or "This is the ABC, and the roof leaks". These are similar to The Goon Show's references to the BBC, e.g. "This is the BBC Home Service." (Coin dropped into charity tin) "Thank you."

Most episodes include references to Woy Woy.

Episode guide

1st Series
   1.   1–1   June 3, 1958   
   2.   1–2   June 10, 1958   
   3.   1–3   June 17, 1958
   4.   1–4   June 24, 1958
   5.   1–5   July 1, 1958
   6.   1–6   July 8, 1958
   7.   1–7   July 15, 1958
   8.   1–8   July 22, 1958
   9.   1–9   July 29, 1958
  10.   1–10  August 5, 1958
  11.   1–11  August 12, 1958 The All Australian Leather Rocket
  12.   1–12  August 19, 1958

The cast was Spike Milligan, John Bluthal, Bobby Limb, Michael Eisdell and Ray Barrett with music by Jim Gussey and the ABC Dance Orchestra. The producer was Max Greaves.

2nd Series
  13.   2–1   June 30, 1959 Son of Andrea
  14.   2–2   July 7, 1959 
  15.   2–3   July 14, 1959
  16.   2–4   July 21, 1959
  17.   2–5   July 28, 1959
  18.   2–6   August 4, 1959
  19.   2–7   August 11, 1959
  20.   2–8   August 18, 1959
  21.   2–9   August 25, 1959
  22.   2–10  September 1, 1959
  23.   2–11  September 8, 1959 The French Connection
  24.   2–12  September 15, 1959
  25.   2–13  September 22, 1959 The Australian Flag

Broadcast dates unknown: The Prime Minister's Trousers, The First Australian into Outer Woy Woy

The cast was Spike Milligan, Bobby Limb, John Bluthal, Peter Carver, Michael Eisdell, announcer Graham Connolly with music by Johnny Bamford (vibraphone), Bruce Findlay (vocals), Jim Gussey and the ABC Dance Orchestra. The producer was John McCloud.

3rd Series
  26.   3–1   August 28, 1962
  27.   3–2   September 4, 1962 
  28.   3–3   September 11, 1962
  29.   3–4   September 18, 1962
  30.   3–5   September 25, 1962
  31.   3–6   October 2, 1962
  32.   3–7   October 9, 1962
  33.   3–8   October 16, 1962
  34.   3–9   October 23, 1962
  35.   3–10  October 30, 1962
  36.   3–11  November 6, 1962
  37.   3–12  November 13, 1962
  38.   3–13  November 20, 1962

Broadcast dates unknown: The Ashes, The King's Bridge Saga, The American Cup, The World's Greatest Adventure, The Spon Plague, King's Cross - The East Berlin of Australia, The Great Christmas Pudding, The Flying Dustman of the Outback.

The cast was Spike Milligan, John Ewart, Ric Hutton, Paul Westerman, Al Thomas, Michael Eisdell, announcer Peter Young with music by Patricia Ridgeway (vocals), Dudley Stapleton (piano), Jim Gussey and the ABC Dance Orchestra. The producer was John McCloud.

Notes
 Some published sources list The Australian Flag and The Prime Minister's Trousers as being in Series 1. Both credit the Series 2 cast. The Australian Flag is announced as "the last of the present series".
 The surviving recording of The First Australian into Outer Woy Woy includes the audience warm up, which includes a short jazz number by the ABC Dance Band with Spike Milligan playing the trumpet.
 The Spon Plague combines elements of The Goon Show's Lurgi Strikes Britain and The Nadger Plague. Some publications list this episode title as The Spon Berry vs The Spon Plague or just Spon. The show is announced as The Spon Plague. In this episode, Spike Milligan sings a version of the Dustbin Dance from the BBC television series A Show Called Fred, the successor to The Idiot Weekly, Price 2d.
 The Great Christmas Pudding is essentially a remake of The Goon Show Operation Christmas Duff with Australian references.
 Some publications list The American Cup as Gretel vs America.
 Some publications list The King's Bridge Saga as The King's Bridge Disaster or The Last Tram to King Street Bridge. The show is announced as The King's Bridge Saga. It contains elements of The Goon Show: The Last Tram (from Clapham). Part of the episode relates to the King Street Bridge in Melbourne which collapsed soon after opening in July 1962.
 Patricia Ridgeway had married Spike Milligan several months prior to series 3.

Recordings
The ABC did not keep all the episodes but a few recordings do survive. Some episodes were recorded off air onto acetate and are held in the archives of The Goon Show Preservation Society and in private collections.

Known surviving recordings are:
Season 1 - Program from 8 July 1958 (partial), The All Australian Leather Rocket (complete).
Season 2 - Son of Andrea (complete), The First Australian into Outer Woy Woy (with audience warm up), The Prime Minister's Trousers (complete with audience warm up), The French Connection (rehearsal), The Australian Flag (complete)
Season 3 - The Ashes (off air recording without music), The King's Bridge Saga (off air recording without music), The American Cup (complete), The World's Greatest Adventure, The Spon Plague, King's Cross - The East Berlin of Australia (without music), The Great Christmas Pudding, The Flying Dustman of the Outback (off air recording without music).

Adaptations and audio releases
Two episodes from Series 3, The Ashes and The Flying Dustman of the Outback, were released on Parlophone LP (PMEO 9376) in 1962.

Six episodes were remade by the BBC as The Omar Khayyam Show.

References
 U.S. Archives of the Goon Show Preservation Soviety
 Old Time Radio Researchers Group

Idiot Weekly
Idiot Weekly